The West Indian cricket team toured India in February 2022 to play three One Day International (ODI) and three Twenty20 International (T20I) matches. The ODI series formed part of the inaugural 2020–2023 ICC Cricket World Cup Super League. In September 2021, the Board of Control for Cricket in India (BCCI) confirmed the schedule for the tour.

In January 2022, to reduce the impact of the COVID-19 affecting the series, the BCCI limited the number of venues to be used, with Ahmedabad and Kolkata hosting the ODI and T20I matches respectively. The date of the third ODI was also moved forward by one day to avoid clashing with the 2022 IPL auction.

The opening fixture of the tour was India's 1,000th ODI match, becoming the first team to play one thousand matches in that format. India went on to win the match by six wickets. India won the second ODI by 44 runs, giving them an unassailable lead in the series. It was India's eleventh consecutive bilateral ODI series victory against the West Indies, a streak going back to January 2007. India won the third ODI by 96 runs to win the series 3–0.

India won the opening T20I match by six wickets. They went on to win the second T20I by eight runs, winning the series with a match to play. The win was also India's 100th victory in Twenty20 International cricket. India won the final match of the tour by 17 runs, to also win the T20I series 3–0.

Squads

Ahead of the tour, Shahrukh Khan and Ravisrinivasan Sai Kishore were both added to India's T20I squad as standby players. Following seven positive cases of COVID-19 in the Indian camp, Mayank Agarwal was added to India's ODI squad. Ishan Kishan, who was originally only part of India's T20I squad, was also added to their ODI squad, along with Shahrukh Khan. Ahead of the T20I series, KL Rahul and Axar Patel were both ruled out of India's team due to injuries. Ruturaj Gaikwad and Deepak Hooda were named as their replacements. Washington Sundar was also ruled out of India's T20I squad, after suffering a hamstring injury, with Kuldeep Yadav named as his replacement. Prior to the third and final T20I of the tour, Virat Kohli and Rishabh Pant were both released from the Indian squad.

ODI series

1st ODI

2nd ODI

3rd ODI

T20I series

1st T20I

2nd T20I

3rd T20I

Notes

References

External links
 Series home at ESPN Cricinfo

2022 in Indian cricket
2022 in West Indian cricket
International cricket competitions in 2021–22
West Indian cricket tours of India